Lenore C. Terr (born New York City, 1936) is a psychiatrist and author known for her research into childhood trauma. Terr graduated from the University of Michigan Medical School with an MD. She is the winner of the Blanche Ittleson Award for her research on childhood trauma. Terr is noted for her work studying the after-effects of the 1976 Chowchilla kidnapping on the 26 children who were buried alive for 16 hours after being kidnapped from a bus.

Too Scared To Cry

Terr's book Too Scared to Cry (Basic Books, 1990) is divided into four parts focusing on childhood psychic trauma: emotions, mental work, behavior and treatment and contagion. The book describes several cases that illustrate the problem of children's statements and behaviors that are based in factitious traumatic events. Terr concludes children who suffered trauma before the age of three years are rarely able fully describe it verbally, instead reenacting events behaviorally. Terr draws on her interviews and follow-up with the victims of the 1976 Chowchilla kidnapping and with a number of similar children from surrounding towns, used as a control group. Lastly, Terr notes the distinction between a single, sudden traumatic event which is accessible to verbal remembering, versus repetitive or prolonged trauma that severely compromises accurate verbal recall.

Repressed memory theory

Terr has been actively involved in advocating the psychological theory of repressed memory, a controversial proposition which asserts people can recall memories which have been repressed, frequently because of trauma. According to the theory, the memory can be suddenly recalled through visual or auditory stimuli and psychological therapeutic treatment. Terr was the primary expert witness for the prosecution in the criminal case of People v. Franklin (1990)—wherein George Thomas Franklin was convicted by a jury in 1990 for the homicide of nine-year-old Susan Nason, a murder that took place more than 20 years previously near Foster City, Calif. The prosecution and ultimate conviction was based solely upon the supposed recovered memory of Franklin's daughter, Eileen, who alleged she witnessed the murder and then for some reason repressed the memory for 21 years before suddenly recovering the memory of the murder and then reporting her recollection of the incident to the San Mateo County, Calif., sheriff's department. Terr was the prosecution's expert witness to support the theory of repressed memory and its corresponding recovery, which was instrumental in the conviction of Franklin. The conviction was later reversed by a federal appeals court, partially because so-called repressed memory is not acceptable as a contributing factor to conviction in a criminal proceeding. 
George Franklin was later exonerated by DNA evidence collected at the crime scene, casting further doubt on the use of repressed memories in criminal trials.

Terr was also the chief witness of the defense in the Gary Ramona trial.

Awards
 1967 — Career teacher award from the National Institute of Mental Health (NIMH).
 Blanche F. Ittleson Award from the American Psychiatric Association.
 2011 — Agnes Purcell McGavin Award for a Distinguished Career in Child and Adolescent Psychiatry, from the  American Psychiatric Association.

Works

Scientific publications
 
 
 
 
 
 
 
 </ref>

Books

References

1936 births
Living people
American psychiatrists
University of California, San Francisco faculty
Child psychologists
University of Michigan Medical School alumni
American women psychiatrists
21st-century American women